The following outline is provided as an overview of and topical guide to the metric system – various loosely related systems of measurement that trace their origin to the decimal system of measurement introduced in France during the French Revolution.

Nature of the metric system 

The metric system can be described as all of the following:

System – set of interacting or interdependent components forming an integrated whole.
System of measurement – set of units which can be used to specify anything which can be measured.  Historically, systems of measurement were initially defined and regulated to support trade and internal commerce. Units were arbitrarily defined by fiat (see statutory law) by the ruling entities and were not necessarily well inter-related or self-consistent. When later analyzed and scientifically, some quantities were designated as base units, meaning all other needed units of measure could be derived from them.

Essence of the metric system 
International System of Units (SI) is the system of units that has been officially endorsed under the Metre Convention since 1960.  Child articles are: 
SI base unit
SI derived unit
Non-SI units mentioned in the SI
Metric prefixes

Underlying philosophy 
Discussions of the underlying philosophy of the metric system (and other systems of measure) include:
Coherence (units of measurement)
Realisation (metrology)

Metric units of measure
Articles that exist for many units of measure that are related to various flavours of the metric system are catalogued below.

History of the metric system 

History of the metric system – the metric system developed from a decimal system of measurement adopted by France after the French Revolution.

Chronological history of the metric system 
Principal dates in the development of the metric system include:
1792 – Initiation of a decimal system of measurement by the French Revolutionary Government
1799 – The Metre des archives and kilogram des archives become the standards for the metric system.
1861 – Concept of unit coherence introduced by Maxwell – the base units were the centimetre, gram and second.  
1875 – Under the Convention of the metre, a new body the General Conference on Weights and Measures (CGPM) was set up and given responsibility for the new international prototype of the kilogram and international prototype of the metre which replaced the old French copies as the definitive prototypes of the metre and the kilogram.
1881 – International Electric Congress agrees on standards for electrical units (formalised in 1893)
1921 – Convention of the metre extended to cover all physical units of measure
1960 – The CGPM published the metric system under the name "International System of Units" (SI) a coherent system of units based on the kilogram, metre, second, ampere and kelvin.

History of metrication 

History of metrication – metrication is the process by which legacy, national-specific systems of measurement were replaced by the metric system.
Metrication in Australia
Metrication in Barbados
Metrication in Canada
Metrication in Chile
Metrication in Guatemala
Metrication in Hong Kong
Metrication in India
Metrication in Ireland
Metrication in Jamaica
Metrication in New Zealand
Metrication in Peru
Metrication in Sweden
Metrication in the United Kingdom
British Metrication Board
Metrication in the United States
Plan for Establishing Uniformity in the USA, Thomas Jefferson's report (1790) which included a proposal for decimal system based on a "decimal foot"
United States Metric Board

Historical metric system variants 
Four variants of the metric system that predate the introduction of SI (1960) are described in varying levels of detail:
MKS system of units formed the basis for SI.
Centimetre–gram–second system of units was the principal variant of the metric system that evolved in stages until it was superseded by SI.
Gravitational metric system was a little-used variant of the metric system that normalised the acceleration due to gravity.
Metre–tonne–second system of units was a variant of the metric system used in French and Russian industry between the First and Second World Wars.

Between 1812 and 1839 France used a quasi-metric system:
Mesures usuelles

History of metric units 
History of the metre

Politics of the metric system 
Prior to 1875 the metric system was controlled by the French Government.  In that year, seventeen nations signed the Metre Convention and the management and administration of the system passed into international control.   
Metre Convention describes the 1875 treaty and its development to the modern day. Three organisations, the CGPM, CIPM and BIPM were set up under the convention. 
General Conference on Weights and Measures (Conférence générale des poids et mesures or CGPM) – a meeting every four to six years of delegates from all member states.
The International Committee for Weights and Measures (Comité international des poids et mesures or CIPM) – an advisory body to the CGPM consisting of prominent metrologists.
The International Bureau of Weights and Measures (Bureau international des poids et mesures or BIPM) – an organisation based at Sèvres, France that has custody of the international prototype of the kilogram, provides metrology services for the CGPM and CIPM, houses the secretariat for these organisations and hosts their formal meetings.

Both the European Union and the International Organization for Standardization have issued directives/recommendations to harmonise the use of units of measure.  These documents endorse the use of SI for most purposes.
European units of measurement directives
ISO/IEC 80000

Future of the metric system 
2019 redefinition of the SI base units – changes in the definitions of the International System of Units, which are based on defined values of physical constants, in use since May 2019.

Metrication groups and authorities
 US Metric Association (USA, 1916–current)
 Metric Commission (Canada, 1971–1985)
 Metrication Board (United Kingdom, 1969–1981)

Metric system publications 
Plan for Establishing Uniformity in the Coinage, Weights, and Measures of the United States text (Thomas Jefferson 1790)

Persons influential in the metric system 
Simon Stevin (1548–1620)
Gabriel Mouton (1618–1694)
Marquis de Condorcet (1743–1794)
Pierre Méchain (1744–1804)
Pierre-Simon Laplace (1749–1827)
Jean Baptiste Joseph Delambre (1749–1822)
Adrien-Marie Legendre (1753–1834)
James Clerk Maxwell (1831–1879)
William Thomson, 1st Baron Kelvin (1824–1907)
Giovanni Giorgi (1871–1950)

See also 
Imperial units

References

External links 

Metric conversions

Outline
Metric system